The Saint John River (Maliseet-Passamaquoddy: Wolastoq) is a  long river that flows from Northern Maine into Canada, and runs south along the western side of New Brunswick, emptying into the Atlantic Ocean in the Bay of Fundy.

A part of the border between New Brunswick and Maine follows 130 km (80 miles) of the river. 
A tributary forms 55 km (35 miles) of the border between Quebec and Maine. 

New Brunswick settlements through which it passes include, moving downstream, Edmundston, Fredericton, Oromocto, and Saint John.

It is regulated by hydro-power dams at Mactaquac, Beechwood, and Grand Falls, New Brunswick.

Hydronym
Samuel de Champlain visited the mouth of the river on the feast day of John the Baptist in 1604 and renamed it the Rivière Saint-Jean or Saint John River in English.  Many waterways in the system retain their original pre-European names. The Maliseet call it the Wolastoq, meaning bountiful and good and seek to restore this name.

Geography and ecology

Upper basin
The headwaters are in the New England/Acadian forests of Maine and Quebec, including the Southwest, Northwest, and Baker branches, and the Allagash River flowing into New Brunswick at Edmundston where it is joined by the Madawaska River.

Middle basin
The middle section runs from the confluence of the Aroostook and Tobique rivers, flowing southeast to Mactaquac Dam. Other tributaries in this section include the Meduxnekeag River. This area is the only place in Atlantic Canada where Appalachian Hardwood Forest is found. Plants rare for the province include wild ginger, black raspberry, wild coffee, maidenhair fern, showy orchis and others. This forest type, also known as the Saint John River Valley Hardwood Forest, once spread of much of the area and has been reduced to less than one percent of the land area because of human activities. This is an area of rolling hills and soils that are the most fertile and heavily farmed in New Brunswick. Soils are fine, loamy, and well-drained glacial tills overlaying limestone and sandstone.

The climate here is drier and warmer than surrounding regions.

Lower basin
The lower basin, 140 kilometres (90 miles) to Saint John Harbour on the Bay of Fundy, consisting of lakes, islands, wetlands and a tidal estuary. Tributaries in this section include the Nashwaak and Nerepis rivers and Belleisle Bay.

The final tributary, the Kennebecasis River, is a fjord with a sill, or rise in depth near the mouth of a fjord caused by a terminal moraine. From the Grand Bay (New Brunswick), the waterway becomes narrower and deeper forming a gorge where at the Reversing Falls incoming tide forces the flow of water to reverse against the prevailing current. A wedge of salt water, below a surface covering of fresh water, extends upriver to the 10 metre (30') shallows at Oak Point beyond which it cannot advance.

Formation and hydrology
In early spring, upper sections of the river can experience ice jams causing flooding. In the lower sections in the broader floodplain, flooding may occur during late spring from the volume of water which must make its way through the narrow gorge at the Reversing Falls.

Legally, all of the river downstream of a point between Fredericton and Mactaquac Provincial Park is considered tidal.

The river is mostly calm, except for waterfalls at Grand Falls and at the Beechwood Dam.

Flooding 
With the water flow in the spring being six times the average rate, the valley has always been prone to flooding in the spring. Surface runoff from heavy rainfall is the main cause of flooding, and can be exacerbated by ice jams, high tides, and rapid snowmelt. Floods have been documented for more than 300 years. Flooding has occurred in Edmundston, Grand Falls, Perth-Andover, Hartland, Woodstock, and most severely around Fredericton and Saint John.

Major flooding has occurred in 1923, with water 8 metres (26') above normal winter low. In 1936 high temperatures quickened snowmelt, and heavy rain raised the water level to 8.9 metres (30'), about 7.6 metres (25') above summer level. Similar circumstances led to the same level of high water in the 1973 flood. Similar major flooding occurred again in 2018 and 2019.  Since 2019, flooding has not been as severe.

The severity and frequency of flooding is expected to increase, with climate change. It is predicted that New Brunswick's average temperature will increase by 5 C (9°F) by the year 2100, and that precipitation will increase.

Human history

At the end of the last glacial period, following the retreat of the Laurentide Ice Sheet about 13,000 years ago, the area was stripped bare of vegetation and soil. By about 10,000 years ago, Paleo-Indians probably occupied what is now New Brunswick.

Although the basin has been subject to human influence for thousands of years, the Native American impact was minimal partly because of their small numbers, and partly because they practised low intensity agriculture. Major disturbances did not begin until the early 1800s with the arrival of large numbers of Europeans.

When the Europeans arrived into Wolastokuk, the homeland of the Maliseet Nation and Saint John River basin, they found the locals hunting, gathering, and farming near the banks of the river. European colonists may have used fields and town sites prepared by the natives. Archaeological evidence is that the Maliseet had economic and cultural ties with large portions of North America from their country's homebase within the Wabanaki Confederacy of Dawnland. The Maliseet dealt with freshets by having their village above the floodplain, for example Meductic, while cultivating at a lower elevation where the fields were fertilized by the floodwaters. The Maliseet were highly mobile and the Saint John River was a primary means of transportation.

While the Maliseet saw themselves as part of the ecosystem, the Europeans' Christian world view held humans are raised above nature by their creator, and must not merely exist as the beasts of the field, but explore and develop nature.

During the 1600 and 1700s, French colonists populated the lower river valley as part of Acadia, with Fort Nashwaak in present-day Fredericton, Fort Boishebert at the confluence of the Saint John and Nerepsis rivers. In the French seigneurial system lands were arranged in long, narrow strips, called seigneuries, along the banks of the river. However this was not practical given the seasonal flooding, and the Acadians moved to higher ground.

Decades of warfare between the British colonies in what is now New England and Acadia, led to the expulsion of the Acadians in 1784. Following the American Revolutionary War, United Empire Loyalists settled the area. Returning Acadians settled the upper valley.

Large numbers of people began settling the area in the early 1800s, mostly Scottish and Irish, and by the end of the 1850s much of the central Saint John valley had been cleared of old-growth forest for farming. Francophone Quebecers moved into the northern areas. In the interwar period, many of these farms were abandoned due to urbanization, and allowed to reforest.

Before the advent of railways, the river was an important trade route, including timber rafting.

In 1925 a hydroelectric dam was built at Grand Falls, followed in 1955 by the Beechwood Dam and the Mactaquac Dam in 1965. Large reservoirs were created behind the dams. Construction of the latter two dams has caused a severe decline in migrating Atlantic salmon, and resource authorities have developed fish ladders and other measures to try to revive the migration.

In 2011, the entire watershed was designated the Wolastoq National Historic Site, and is as the traditional territory of the Wolastoqiyik First Nation.

The forested areas of the Maine North Woods where the river rises is mostly uninhabited.

Gallery

See also
 List of crossings of the Saint John River
 List of longest rivers of Canada
 List of rivers of Maine
 List of bodies of water of New Brunswick

References

External links

 
Rivers of Maine
Rivers of New Brunswick
International rivers of North America
Canada–United States border
Borders of Maine
North Maine Woods
Northern Forest Canoe Trail
Rivers with fish ladders